Antonín Dvořák's Piano Trio No. 2 in G minor, Op. 26 (B. 57), is a chamber composition, written in 1876.  The trio was written shortly after the death of his eldest daughter Josefa, and although Dvorak never wrote that the piece was intended as a memorial it is generally regarded as such.  The Presto - Trio movement foreshadows the more well-known Slavonic Dances.

Structure 
The composition consists of four movements in the classical tradition:

Recordings
Suk Trio (2001): Dvořák: Complete Piano Trios - Supraphon 3545.

References

External links
 
 , performed by the Busch Trio

1876 compositions
Compositions in G minor
Piano trios by Antonín Dvořák